is a Japanese light novel series written by Shin Araki and illustrated by Aruya. An anime television series adaptation animated by Doga Kobo, aired between January 10 and March 28, 2013. A special 46-minute-long OVA was released on May 14, 2014.

Plot
Shinomiya Kyōya is forced to become a new member of the GJ-bu (lit. GJ Club), an unidentified club that dwells in a room of the former building of a certain school. There he meets four girls: Mao, Megumi, Shion and Kirara. Time flies with these unique girls around. The series follows the everyday, though unusual, antics of this band of friends.

Characters

GJ Club

 Nicknamed "Kyoro", Kyōya is the main protagonist of the series. He is the sole male member of GJ-bu, joining the club after being kidnapped by the others. He is a kind and courteous person who is the usual target of the other girls' teasing, frustration and, sometimes, their affection as well. Despite him being completely spineless in comparison to other males, Kyōya seems to have an innate talent in dealing with the opposing sex, like making them skip a beat when he temporarily assumes a more manly and less formal kind of speech or when carefully brushing their hair, a talent he claims he learned upon regularly combing his little sister's hair. He and Mao are almost always seen reading manga and light novels.

 Mao is the older sister of Megumi and the club's president. She is a small girl who has orange hair and brown eyes. She has the habit of biting and picking on Kyōya when she is bored or angry. She can't stand kissing, to the point of carefully choosing shows to watch or books to read without kiss scenes at all and can barely tolerate the idea of a forehead or cheek kiss. She and Kyouya are almost always seen reading manga and light novels.

 Nicknamed "Megu", Megumi is the middle sister of the Amatsuka family. She is taller than Mao and has pink hair and eyes. She is a nice girl and is always seen making tea inside the club room. She likes to knit and is the one who knit together the club costumes. She always seems to have a calm demeanor even when everyone else in the club is scared. However, she seems to mind her weight, as whenever it is mentioned, she panics.

 Nicknamed "Shī", Shion is a recognized genius chess player and has many brothers, all recognized as experts in some kind of activity. She has violet hair and eyes and has a low body temperature. As Shion is the sole daughter in her family, she likes to dote on younger girls acting as an older sister to them. 

 Kirara is the tallest and strongest member of the club with blue eyes and blonde hair shaped into cat ears. She is always seen eating meat of some sort and tends to be very possessive of it. The only person she will share her meat with is Kyōya. She can talk to cats and usually behaves like one. She has a huge fear of spiders due to being bitten by a venomous one when she was younger and has little tolerance to alcohol, as she once got drunk just by eating some whiskey chocolates. She is the older sister of Geraldine, and can speak English well.

The newest member of GJ-bu. Just like Kyōya, she is invited to the club after being kidnapped by the others. She has several younger siblings. Tamaki is usually seen carrying a camera, which she can easily hide, and eating snacks, especially potato chips. Also, she is usually angering Megumi, as she always states that she won't get fat no matter how much she eats.

GJ Club Junior High School Division

 Kasumi is Kyōya's younger sister. She is hinted to have a brother complex, where she hides all his novels, only leaving one because it has a little sister as the heroine. Mao, by making use of the fact that she looks younger than her, is able to hide the fact that she is the actual president of the GJ-bu from Kasumi. Kasumi is good friends with both Seira and Geraldine, and even creates her own GJ-bu, called Chūto-bu.

 The youngest sister in the Amatsuka family. Usually dressed in a Goth-Lolita style, she has long black hair, red eyes and a cat clip on her head which she talks through using unknown means, presumed by Mao to be either ventriloquism or some manner of supernatural ability; with this, she usually states her true feelings to Kyōya. However, she always acts polite and cute when not using her cat clip. She is very fond of her sisters and looks grudgingly toward Kyōya when he gets too close to them.

 The younger sister of Kirara Bernstein. She came from Canada to visit her sister and views Kyōya as a Prince Charming since he helped her during their first meeting. She refers Kyōya as "Samurai Master". She has similar strength to her sister Kirara.

Unlike Kyōya, he talks in a pretty rude manner and is nicknamed "Kenken". He usually reads manga. He also has a frog he picked up somewhere named  which is kept in the club room.

He appears to be cool and had excellent results in class. Nicknamed "Jinjin", his hobby is reading, and he usually reads light novel in the club room. Similar to Shion, he is also excellent at playing chess, and is called the second generation of the cute creature (which Shion had mentioned to her image in Episode 10).

Her face looks emotionless, and she is also a chamberlain from Amatsuka household. She has a strong relation to Mori, except her size. Like Megumi, she is the one who serves tea to the club members. Kasumi called her "Komorin" and Kenta called her "Tomochan".

Other characters

 The Amatsuka family maid, who likes to ride motorcycles. A running gag is her twirling before Kyōya much to his pleasure and annoyance to the rest of the club members. She claims that the 1st "last boss" that Kyōya defeated with his hair brushing skill was her mother and not her, even though they looked identical with the same name.

Kyōya's classmate, who has been friends with Kyōya since junior high school.

Kyōya's classmate, he is the childhood friend of the class' most beautiful girl .

Kyōya's homeroom teacher, nicknamed "Nacchan".

Shion's chess partner that she considered as the world's best. He had promised a match with Shion since she was eight years old, and finally won by Shion. In volume 9, he came to Japan to a direct match with Shion.

Mao's classmate, who seat next to Mao. She sometimes seat under GJ Club's kotatsu.

Kenta and Jun's classmate, known as the most beautiful one in their class. She once passed a love letter to Kenta but rejected, but she still want him.

Kasumi's homeroom PE teacher.

He usually represents the GJ club junior high division's members.

Kasumi's classmate and nicknamed "Ricchan".

Media

Light novels
The light novel series GJ-bu is written by Shin Araki and illustrated by Aruya. It is published by Shogakukan. The first volume was published on March 18, 2010 and the final, ninth - on March 16, 2012. On April 18, 2012, the first volume of the spin-off series  was published. As of January 17, 2014, there have been eight volumes published A special volume, titled  was published on March 19, 2013, and another, titled  was released on April 18, 2014.

List of GJ-bu volumes

List of GJ-bu Chūtō-bu volumes

Anime
The anime aired between January 10 and March 28, 2013. It has been licensed for streaming by Crunchyroll.
 by Mao Amatsuka and Megumi Amatsuka (Episode 1-2).
 by Shion Sumeragi (Episode 3-4).
 by Kirara Bernstein (Episode 5-6).
 by Mao Amatsuka, Megumi Amatsuka, Shion Sumeragi, and Kirara Bernstein (Episode 7-12.
The insert song for Episode 12 is "GRADUATION COLOR" by Mao Amatsuka. The first, second, and third ending are featured in the first OST "G", and Hashiri Dasō! with GRADUATION COLOR are featured in the second OST "J".

A DVD and Blu-ray version of the series was released on March 19, 2014. A special OVA, titled , will be released on DVD and Blu-ray Disc on May 14, 2014. The special is 46 minutes long and its story is set after graduation, when the GJ club visits New York for their spring vacation.

Episode list

See also
Hero Classroom - Another light novel series by the same author

References

External links
 Official anime website 
 

2010 Japanese novels
2012 Japanese novels
Anime and manga based on light novels
Cross-dressing in anime and manga
Doga Kobo
Gagaga Bunko
Light novels
Nippon TV original programming
School life in anime and manga
Shogakukan franchises
Slice of life anime and manga
Television shows based on light novels